Jérémie Airport  is  west of Jérémie in the Grand'Anse (department) of Haiti and is the fifth busiest airport in Haiti in terms of passenger traffic. The Jérémie non-directional beacon (Ident: JRM) is located on the field.

History
Jérémie airport was freshly renovated in 2020 to allow for bigger planes to land. The arrival and departure terminals were also renovated. There are talks of expanding the runway to be big enough to allow international flights to land directly in Jérémie. Such a change would allow for international flights to land directly to the Southern part of Haiti, bypassing the busy Capital, Port-au-Prince. The Southern Peninsula of Haiti is very beautiful with a lot of opportunity for beautiful landscape pictures, and contains some of the best looking natural white sand beaches. However, the Haitian authorities are working on filing the appropriate registration to list the runway as such.

Airlines and destinations

The following airlines operate regular scheduled and charter services at the airport:

See also
Transport in Haiti
List of airports in Haiti

References

External links
OpenStreetMap - Jérémie
OurAirports - Jérémie
FallingRain - Jérémie Airport

Airports in Haiti